The 2015 FIBA Europe Under-20 Championship for Women was the 14th edition of the FIBA Europe Under-20 Championship for Women. 16 teams participated in the competition, played in Tinajo and Teguise, Spain, from 2 to 12 July 2015.

Participating teams

  (Winners, 2014 FIBA Europe Under-20 Championship for Women Division B)
  (Runners-up, 2014 FIBA Europe Under-20 Championship for Women Division B)

  (3rd place, 2014 FIBA Europe Under-20 Championship for Women Division B)

First round
The first-round groups draw took place on 30 November 2014 in Budapest, Hungary. In the first round, the sixteen teams are allocated in four groups of four teams each. The top three teams of each group will qualify to the Second Round. The last team of each group will play in the Classification Group G first, then in the 9th–16th place playoffs.

All times are local – Western European Summer Time (UTC+1).

Group A

Group B

Group C

Group D

Second round
Twelve advancing teams from the First Round will be allocated in two groups of six teams each. The top four teams of each group will advance to the quarterfinals. The last two teams of each group will play for the 9th – 16th places against the teams from the Group G.

Group E

|}

Group F

|}

Classification Group G
Last placed team from each group of first round competes in classification round-robin group for lower four seeds in 9th–16th place playoff.

Classification playoffs for 9th – 16th place

Classification games for 9th – 16th place

Classification games for 13th – 16th place

Classification games for 9th – 12th place

Championship playoffs

Quarterfinals

Classification games for 5th – 8th place

Semifinals

Final classification games

Match for 15th place

Match for 13th place

Match for 11th place

Match for 9th place

Match for 7th place

Match for 5th place

Bronze medal match

Final

Final standings

Awards

All-Tournament Team
  Leticia Romero
  Laura Quevedo 
  Marine Johannès 
  Aby Gaye 
  Emese Hof

References

External links
FIBA official website

2015
2015–16 in European women's basketball
2015–16 in Spanish women's basketball
International women's basketball competitions hosted by Spain
2015 in youth sport